"Reach Out" is a song from Take That's fourth album, Beautiful World, released as the album's fourth single on 22 June 2007. Reach Out was released exclusively in Europe, as an alternative to the British-only single "I'd Wait for Life".

Background
It performed well across Europe, peaking inside the top twenty in the Danish charts and narrowly missing the top ten in the Italian charts, peaking at number 11. No official music video was produced for the release, although, the Italian division of Universal Music ran a competition for people to produce a music video based on the song, and the winning entry, directed by Alisha Antylla, was aired once on Total Request Live on MTV Italy.

Critical reception

Alexis Petridis from The Guardian described the song as a "dazzingly effective pop song." AllMusic mentioned that the uptempo track showed the group "were obviously enjoying every minute of the comeback".

Personnel
Gary Barlow – lead vocals
Howard Donald – backing vocals
Jason Orange – backing vocals
Mark Owen – backing vocals

Track listing
 CD single
 "Reach Out" – 4:16
 "We All Fall Down" (acoustic) – 3:51

 Limited edition CD single
 "Reach Out" – 4:16
 "We All Fall Down" (acoustic) – 3:51
 "Shine" (BBC Radio 2 'Live & Exclusive') – 3:36
 "Back for Good" (BBC Radio 2 'Live & Exclusive') – 4:11

Charts

References

2007 singles
Take That songs
Songs written by John Shanks
Songs written by Gary Barlow
Songs written by Mark Owen
Songs written by Jason Orange
Songs written by Howard Donald
2006 songs
Polydor Records singles